Walter Tysall (3 April 1880 – 1955) was a British gymnast who competed in the 1908 Summer Olympics. He was born in Birmingham and died in Ashton-on-Ribble. In 1908 he won the silver medal in the individual all-around.

References

External links
Walter Tysall's profile at databaseOlympics 
Walter Tysall's profile at Sports Reference.com

1880 births
1955 deaths
Sportspeople from Birmingham, West Midlands
British male artistic gymnasts
Gymnasts at the 1908 Summer Olympics
Olympic gymnasts of Great Britain
Olympic silver medallists for Great Britain
Olympic medalists in gymnastics
Medalists at the 1908 Summer Olympics